The Argus Observer is the daily newspaper of Ontario, Oregon, United States.

The newspaper was established on January 6, 1897, and went through several names and owners before becoming the Argus Observer, which is a reference to Argus Panoptes, a creature from Greek mythology that had 100 eyes. The Argus Observer is owned by Wick Communications.

The Argus was founded January 6, 1897 as the District Silver Advocate, originally in Vale, Oregon. It later changed its name to the Advocate, and became an organ of the Democratic Party. Don Carlos Boyd purchased it in 1900, changing its allegiance to Republican, assuming the name Argus, and moving it to Ontario. In the paper's first decade it was generally a weekly newspaper, with at least two short-lived efforts to switch to daily publication.

The Eastern Oregon Observer was founded in Ontario by Elmo Smith in 1937.

The two newspapers merged in 1947, and assumed a daily publication schedule in 1970.

See also
List of newspapers in Oregon

References

External links

1897 establishments in Oregon
Publications established in 1897
Ontario, Oregon
Oregon Newspaper Publishers Association
Wick Communications publications
Newspapers published in Oregon